The Namhae Expressway Branch 1, or the Namhae Expressway 1st Branch is an expressway in South Korea, connecting Haman to Changwon. It is Branch Line of Namhae Expressway.

History 
 14 November 1973: Open to Traffic.(This segment is one of the Namhae Expressway)
 25 August 2001: Masan Oegwak Expressway(마산외곽고속도로) opens to traffic.(Sanin~Changwon)
 17 November 2008: This segment is endowed name with Namhae 1st Branch Expressway, And Masan Oegwak Expressway is changed name with Namhae Expressway.

Constructions

Lanes 
 4 lanes

Length 
 17.88 km

Limited Speed 
 100 km/h

List of facilities 

 IC: Interchange, JC: Junction, SA: Service Area, TG:Tollgate

See also 
 Namhae Expressway
 Namhae Expressway Branch 2

External links 
 MOLIT South Korean Government Transport Department

Expressways in South Korea
Roads in South Gyeongsang